Matt Glaeser (born April 27, 1985) is a former American soccer player and coach. He is currently the head coach and technical director of USL League One club Forward Madison FC.

Career

College and Amateur
Glaeser played college soccer at James Madison University and the University of Hartford, where he was the America East Conference Goalkeeper of the Year and the NSCAA Northeast Region Goalkeeper of the Year as a senior. In 2007 Glaeser led the Hawks to their first appearance in the America East Championship since 2003, playing every minute in goal, allowing just 18 goals, less than one per game.

Professional
Glaeser was expected to be a high pick at the 2008 MLS SuperDraft, but was not drafted by any team, and was forced to look elsewhere for games; he subsequently signed for the Western Mass Pioneers in the USL Second Division, and played 20 games between the posts in his debut professional season.

After a successful trial Glaeser signed for Finnish club Pallo-Iirot in 2009, and spent the year playing for them in the Kakkonen, the Finnish third division.

Glaeser returned to the United States in 2010 and signed for Miami FC of the USSF Division 2 Professional League. He spent most of the early part of the year as a backup keeper to Caleb Patterson-Sewell, and spent a brief period on loan at state rivals FC Tampa Bay as injury cover, before making his debut for the team on September 11, 2010 in a 2-1 win over Montreal Impact. During the 2011 season Glaeser started 27 games for Fort Lauderdale. As a result of his good performances, Glaeser signed a new contract with the club in July 2011, tying him down through the 2012 season with an option for an additional year.

On March 28, 2014, Glaeser signed with USL Pro club Wilmington Hammerheads. In addition to his signing as an active player on the club roster, Glaeser will also be the club's Goalkeeper Coach and Community Development Coordinator.

Glaeser retired from playing at the end of the 2015 season.

On 3 December 2021, Glaeser was announced as head coach of Forward Madison FC in USL League One.

References

External links
 Associated Sports Management profile

1985 births
Living people
American soccer players
Hartford Hawks men's soccer players
James Madison Dukes men's soccer players
Western Mass Pioneers players
Miami FC (2006) players
Tampa Bay Rowdies players
Fort Lauderdale Strikers players
USL Second Division players
USSF Division 2 Professional League players
North American Soccer League players
Soccer players from Virginia
USL Championship players
Association football goalkeepers
Pallo-Iirot players
American expatriate soccer players
American expatriate sportspeople in Finland
Expatriate footballers in Finland
Wilmington Hammerheads FC players
Real Monarchs coaches
Real Salt Lake non-playing staff
American soccer coaches
Sacramento Republic FC coaches
Forward Madison FC coaches
USL League One coaches
Sportspeople from Fredericksburg, Virginia